Meena is a sub-group of Bhils, an ethnic group in western India. They speak Meena language. Its name is also transliterated as Meenanda or Mina. They got the status of Scheduled Tribe by the Government of India in 1954. They are also called Minavar.

The Zamindar Meena, Chowkidar Meena, Gurjar Meena, Padiyar Meena, Bhil Meena, Rawat Meena, Takur Meena and Rajput Meena are a subgroup of Meenas.

Etymology 
Meena and Mina are derived from a Dravidian word Meen which means fish in Sanskrit.

Ethnography 

The Meenas were originally a nomadic tribe. They were described as a semi-wild and hill tribe similar to the Bhils. But in the British Raj, for the fulfillment of its purpose by the British Government, they were described as a criminal tribe by adding them to the Criminal Tribes Act. Presently they are described as Scheduled Tribe by the Indian Government.

Geography 
The book Civilizations of India, published in 1887, notes that the Meenas lived in fortified villages on the Aravalli hills in the middle of Rajputana. Presently they are present in the states of Rajasthan, Madhya Pradesh, Maharashtra, Uttar Pradesh, Punjab and Haryana and the Union Territory of Delhi in India.

History 

The Meenas claim a mythological descent from the Matsya avatar, or fish incarnation, of Vishnu. They also claim to be descendants of the people of the Matsya Kingdom, which flourished in the 6th century B.C. The historian Pramod Kumar notes that it is likely that the tribes living in the ancient Matsya kingdom were called Meena but it cannot be said with certainty that there is anything common between them and the modern Meenas. They are considered to be adivasi (aboriginal people).

Nandini Sinha Kapur, a historian who has studied early India, notes that the oral traditions of the Meenas were developed from the early 19th century AD in an attempt to reconstruct their identity. She says of this process, which continued throughout the 20th century, that "The Minas try to furnish themselves a respectable present by giving themselves a glorious past". In common with the people of countries such as Finland and Scotland, the Meenas found it necessary to invent tradition through oral accounts, one of the primary uses of which is recognised by both historians and sociologists as being "social protest against injustices, exploitation and oppression, a raison d'être that helps to retrieve the image of a community." Kapur notes that the Meenas not merely lack a recorded history of their own but also have been depicted in a negative manner both by medieval Persian accounts and records of the colonial period. From medieval times through to the British Raj, references to the Meenas describe them as violent, plundering criminals and an anti-social ethnic tribal group.

According to Kapur, the Meenas also attempt Rajputization of themselves.

Gustave Le Bon, in his book Civilizations of India, described the Meenas as a half-wild tribe similar to the Bhils.

Rajput period 
The Meenas ruled at certain places in Rajasthan until they were overpowered by invading Rajputs. From Meenas the Bundi was captured by Rao Dewa (A.D. 1342), Dhundhar by Kachhwaha Rajputs and Chopoli fell to the Muslim rulers. Kota, Jhalawar, Karauli and Jalore were the other areas of earlier Meena influence where they were forced to surrender ultimately.

British colonial period 

The Raj colonial administration came into existence in 1858, following the Indian Rebellion of 1857 which caused the government of Britain to decide that leaving colonial administration in the hands of the East India Company was a recipe for further discontent. In an attempt to create an orderly administration through a better understanding of the populace, the Raj authorities instituted various measures of classifying the people of India. One such measure was the Criminal Tribes Act of 1871, under the provisions of which Meenas were placed in the first list of 1872. The community remained stigmatised for many years, notably by influential officials of the Raj such as Herbert Hope Risley and Denzil Ibbetson, and were sometimes categorised as animists and as a hill tribe similar to the Bhils. In protest against this act, the Meenas organized a massive agitation against the British in the 1940s under the leadership of Laxminarayan Jharwal. The Meenas remained an officially designated criminal tribe until 1952, three years after the Act had been repealed. Mark Brown has examined the impact and issues of the Meena community during British rule and the change in their status from being a higher social group to a criminal tribe.

Recent history 

Kumar Suresh Singh notes that the Meenas have not abandoned their customary laws. Meenas have better rights for women in many respects compared to many other Hindu castes.

Caste reservation

The Meena fall into the Scheduled Tribe category in the state of Rajasthan and the majority of them are classified as being Hindu, but in Madhya Pradesh Meena are recognised as a Scheduled Tribe only in Sironj Tehsil, Vidisha, while in the other 44 districts of the state they are categorised as Other Backward Classes. It has been proposed that the Meenas be fully recognised as a Scheduled Tribe in Madhya Pradesh. The proposal is being considered by the Government of India. In Uttar Pradesh, Meena are considered migrated from Rajasthan and have been living in western districts of Mathura, Sambhal and Budaun  since many generations. At par their origin they are granted a Scheduled tribe status in the state of Uttar Pradesh. In Haryana they are classified as Other Backward Classes. In Maharashtra also Meenas come under the Other Backward Classes.

In Rajasthan, the Meena caste members oppose the entry of Gurjars into Scheduled Tribe fold, fearing that their own share of Scheduled Tribe reservation benefits will be eroded.

They celebrate Meenesh Jayanti on the third day of the Chaitra month's Shukla paksha.

Subdivisions 

The Meenas themselves are also a sub-group of Bhils.

The Meenas have more than thirty sub-groups.

The Meena tribe is divided into several clans and sub-clans (adakhs), which are named after their ancestors. Some of the adakhs include Ariat, Ahari, Katara, Kalsua, Kharadi, Damore, Ghoghra, Dali, Doma, Nanama, Dadore, Manaut, Charpota, Mahinda, Rana, Damia, Dadia, Parmar, Phargi, Bamna, Khat, Hurat, Hela, Bhagora, and Wagat.

Bhil Meena is another sub-division among the Meenas. As part of a sanskritisation process, some Bhils present themselves as Meenas, who hold a higher socio-economic status compared to the Bhil tribal people.

A sub-group known as "Ujwal Meena" (also "Ujala Meena" or "Parihar Meena") seek higher status, and claim to be Rajputs, thus distinguishing themselves from the Bhil Meenas. They follow vegetarianism, unlike other Meenas whom they designated as "Mailay Meena".

Other prevalent social groupings are Zamindar Meena and the Chaukidar Meena. The Zamindar Meena, comparatively well-off, are those who surrendered to powerful Rajput invaders and settled on the lands believe to be granted by the Rajputs. Those who did not surrender to Rajput rule and kept on waging guerrilla warfare are called the Chaukidar Meena.

Chanda dynasty is a clan among the Meenas. Dhundhar was ruled by the Chanda clan of the Meenas before the Rajputs.

Culture 

There is a custom in the Meenas to perform Pitra Tarpan after taking a collective bath on the day of Diwali. They adopt the culture of worshiping trees and plants in marriages, festivals and other ceremonies as per the Dharadi tradition. They started adopting the Brahmin worship system. They worship different family deities according to the gotra.

Demographics 

According to the 2011 Census of India, the Meenas have a total population of 5 million. According to a report by Hindustan Times, the population of Meenas in Rajasthan is 7% of the state's population. And according to the report of a German news television Deutsche Welle, the Meenas constitute 10% of the population of the state of Rajasthan. Whereas according to a report by BBC Hindi, the population of Meenas is 14% of the state's population. Meenas use Meena language in some districts of Rajasthan.

Rajasthan

Notable people 
List of Meena people in current Rajya Sabha.

List of Meena people in current Lok Sabha.

Rajasthan Legislative Assembly 
According to BBC Hindi's 2007 report, the number of Meena MLAs in the 12th Rajasthan Legislative Assembly was 31. List of Meena people in present Rajasthan Legislative Assembly.

See also 

Rajasthani people

References

Further reading 

Social groups of India
Social groups of Rajasthan
Social groups of Madhya Pradesh
Social groups of Punjab, India
Social groups of Haryana
Social groups of Uttar Pradesh
Scheduled Tribes of India
Scheduled Tribes of Rajasthan
Scheduled Tribes of Madhya Pradesh
Other Backward Classes
Other Backward Classes of Haryana
Other Backward Classes of Maharashtra
Other Backward Classes of Madhya Pradesh
History of Rajasthan
Denotified tribes of India
Indian surnames
Ethnic groups in India